Maya Harrisson (born March 3, 1992) is a Swiss-Brazilian alpine skier who lives in Geneva, Switzerland.

Born in Brazil, she was adopted and spent her childhood in Switzerland, where she discovered skiing. She lives in Geneva and studies at the Haute école de santé to become a Physiotherapist. Thanks to her double nationality (Swiss-Brazilian) she competed for Brazil at the 2010 Winter Olympics at only 17 years old. Four years later she competed in the slalom and giant slalom events at the Sochi 2014 Olympic Games in Russia.

References

External links
 
 

1992 births
Living people
Sportspeople from Rio de Janeiro (state)
Sportspeople from Geneva
Swiss female alpine skiers
Brazilian female alpine skiers
Olympic alpine skiers of Brazil
Alpine skiers at the 2010 Winter Olympics
Alpine skiers at the 2014 Winter Olympics